A total station (TS) or total station theodolite (TST) is an electronic/optical instrument used for surveying and building construction.  It is an electronic transit theodolite integrated with electronic distance measurement (EDM) to measure both vertical and horizontal angles and the slope distance from the instrument to a particular point, and an on-board computer to collect data and perform triangulation calculations.

Robotic or motorized total stations allow the operator to control the instrument from a distance via remote control. In theory, this eliminates the need for an assistant staff member as the operator holds the retroreflector and controls the total station from the observed point. In practice however, an assistant surveyor is often needed when the surveying is being conducted in busy areas such as on a public carriageway or construction site. This is to prevent people from disrupting the total station as they walk past, which would neccesitate resetting the tripod and re-establishing a baseline. Additionally, an assistant surveyor discourages opportunistic theft, which is not uncommon due to the value of the instrument. These motorized total stations can also be used in automated setups known as Automated Motorized Total Station  (AMTS).

Function

Angle measurement 

Most total station instruments measure angles by means of electro-optical scanning of extremely precise digital bar-codes etched on rotating glass cylinders or discs within the instrument. The best quality total stations are capable of measuring angles to 0.5 arc-second. Inexpensive "construction grade" total stations can generally measure angles to 5 or 10 arc-seconds.

Distance measurement 

Measurement of distance is accomplished with a modulated infrared carrier signal, generated by a small solid-state emitter within the instrument's optical path, and reflected by a prism reflector or the object under survey. The modulation pattern in the returning signal is read and interpreted by the computer in the total station. The distance is determined by emitting and receiving multiple frequencies, and determining the integer number of wavelengths to the target for each frequency. Most total stations use purpose-built glass prism (surveying) reflectors for the EDM signal.

Reflectorless total stations can measure distances to any object that is reasonably light in color, up to a few hundred meters.

Coordinate measurement 

The coordinates of an unknown point relative to a known coordinate can be determined using the total station as long as a direct line of sight can be established between the two points. Angles and distances are measured from the total station to points under survey, and the coordinates (X, Y, and Z; or easting, northing, and elevation) of surveyed points relative to the total station position are calculated using trigonometry and triangulation.

To determine an absolute location, a total station requires line of sight observations and can be set up over a known point or with line of sight to 2 or more points with known location, called free stationing.

For this reason, some total stations also have a Global Navigation Satellite System receiver and do not require a direct line of sight to determine coordinates. However, GNSS measurements may require longer occupation periods and offer relatively poor accuracy in the vertical axis.

Data processing 

Some models include internal electronic data storage to record distance, horizontal angle, and vertical angle measured, while other models are equipped to write these measurements to an external data collector, such as a hand-held computer.

When data is downloaded from a total station onto a computer, application software can be used to compute results and generate a map of the surveyed area. The newest generation of total stations can also show the map on the touch-screen of the instrument immediately after measuring the points.

Applications 

Total stations are mainly used by land surveyors and civil engineers, either to record features as in topographic surveying or to set out features (such as roads, houses or boundaries). They are also used by archaeologists to record excavations and by police, crime scene investigators, private accident reconstructionists and insurance companies to take measurements of scenes.

Mining 
Total stations are the primary survey instrument used in mining surveying.

A total station is used to record the absolute location of the tunnel walls, ceilings (backs), and floors as the drifts of an underground mine are driven. The recorded data are then downloaded into a CAD program, and compared to the designed layout of the tunnel.

The survey party installs control stations at regular intervals. These are small steel plugs installed in pairs in holes drilled into walls or the back. For wall stations, two plugs are installed in opposite walls, forming a line perpendicular to the drift. For back stations, two plugs are installed in the back, forming a line parallel to the drift.

A set of plugs can be used to locate the total station set up in a drift or tunnel by processing measurements to the plugs by intersection and resection.

Mechanical and electrical construction 
Total stations have become the highest standard for most forms of construction layout.

They are most often used in the X and Y axis to lay out the locations of penetrations out of the underground utilities into the foundation, between floors of a structure, as well as roofing penetrations.

Because more commercial and industrial construction jobs have become centered around building information modeling (BIM), the coordinates for almost every pipe, conduit, duct and hanger support are available with digital precision. The application of communicating a virtual model to a tangible construction potentially eliminates labor costs related to moving poorly measured systems, as well as time spent laying out these systems in the midst of a full blown construction job in progress.

Meteorology
Meteorologists also use total stations to track weather balloons for determining upper-level winds.  With the average ascent rate of the weather balloon known or assumed, the change in azimuth and elevation readings provided by the total station as it tracks the weather balloon over time are used to compute the wind speed and direction at different altitudes.  Additionally, the total station is used to track ceiling balloons to determine the height of cloud layers.  Such upper-level wind data is often used for aviation weather forecasting and rocket launches.

Instrument manufacturers 
 Carl Zeiss (historical)
 GeoMax, part of Hexagon AB
 Hewlett Packard (historical)
 Hilti Corporation
 Nikon, part of Trimble
 Leica Geosystems, part of Hexagon AB
 North Group LTD (historical)
 Sokkia, part of Topcon
 TI Asahi Co. Ltd, sold under the Pentax brand
 Topcon
 Trimble Navigation Ltd.
 Wild Heerbrugg AG (historical), part of Leica Geosystems
 Stonex (company)

See also

 Compass
 LIDAR
 Local attraction
 Resection (free stationing)
 Surveying
 Tacheometry
 Theodolite
 Trigonometric leveling

References

External links
 Using a Total Station
 Total Station Manual with Laser Scanner Function
 Online computation of total station measurements

Civil engineering
Construction surveying
Geodesy
Optical instruments
Surveying instruments